The Fountain Formation is a Pennsylvanian bedrock unit consisting primarily of conglomerate, sandstone, or arkose, in the states of Colorado and Wyoming in the United States, along the east side of the Front Range of the Rocky Mountains, and along the west edge of the Denver Basin.

Origin of name
The Fountain Formation was named by geologist W. C. Cross in 1894 for exposures along Fountain Creek in El Paso County, Colorado.

Stratigraphy 

The Fountain Formation is found along the Front Range of Colorado. To the north, the Formation unconformably overlies Precambrian granite and gneiss. To the south, it overlies Mississippian, Ordovician and Devonian Limestones, as well as Cambrian sandstones. Outcrops of the formation typically dip steeply to the east.

Depositional environment 
The formation was formed by the erosion of the Ancestral Rocky Mountains, and deposition by fluvial processes as alluvial fans. The characteristic predominant red color and the composition of the Fountain reflect that of the granites and gneisses from which it was eroded.

Notable outcrops 
 Flatirons, near Boulder, Colorado
 Red Rocks Park and Amphitheater, Golden, Colorado
 Roxborough State Park, south of Denver, Colorado
 Garden of the Gods in Colorado Springs, Colorado
 Red Rock Canyon Open Space in Colorado Springs, Colorado

Fossils 
Marine invertebrates have been discovered in a limestone and shale member of the Fountain Formation, cropping out on a low hogback in Perry Park.  Invertebrates include bryozoans, brachiopods, crinoids, echinoids, and gastropods.

Plant fossils have been discovered in Garden Park north of Cañon City, including Lepidophloios laricinus, Sigillaria, Syringodendron sp., Lepidophyloides sp., Lepidostrobus sp., Lepidostrobophyllum sp., Calamites, Neuropterus sp., Cyclopteris sp., and Stigmaria ficoides.

Age 
Rocks of the Fountain Formation are considered to be of Late Pennsylvanian age, and are between 290 and 340 million years old.

References

External links 
 Gravmag.com: Geology of the Fountain Formation

 
Pennsylvanian North America
Geologic formations of Colorado
Carboniferous Colorado
Sandstone formations of the United States
Conglomerate formations
Fluvial deposits
Carboniferous southern paleotropical deposits